William L. Richards (February 7, 1881 – April 10, 1941) was a member of the Wisconsin State Senate.

He was born in Milwaukee, Wisconsin. He graduated from Marquette University and the Milwaukee Law School.

Career
Richards represented the 4th district of the Senate from 1913 to 1916, but was unseated in a five-way Republican primary by challenger Herman C. Schultz and three other candidates. Previously, he was a candidate to be a Milwaukee alderman in 1912. He was a Republican.

Richards died in Milwaukee at the age of 61.

References

Politicians from Milwaukee
Republican Party Wisconsin state senators
Marquette University alumni
Milwaukee Law School alumni
1881 births
1941 deaths
20th-century American politicians